The Central Region is one of the five regions in the city-state of Singapore and the main metropolitan region surrounding the Central Area. Comprising 13,150 hectares of land area, it includes 11 planning areas within the Central Area, as well as another 11 more outside it. The region is home to many of Singapore's national monuments as it was historically the site where the city was first founded and the country's only UNESCO World Heritage Site, the Singapore Botanic Gardens, a -year-old tropical garden is also located in the region.

Although the Central Area is by nature chiefly commercial, especially the area in the Downtown Core, it also includes 335,400 residential housing units of various types, ranging from HDB flats to more exclusive forms of private housing, such as bungalows. There are also 1000 hectares of green spaces, including parks, gardens and other recreational spaces linked by 19 km of park connectors, which were built in order to make this area aesthetically pleasing.

History

Planning strategies

Planning considerations for the URA Master Plan 2003 involving the Central Region took into consideration its existing strengths. Besides being the core area for business and entertainment in the city, it contains districts steeped in history, various housing types, and numerous institutions for education and community life. Despite the highly built-up character, it still boasts a rich variety of parks, open spaces, and other recreational areas. It is also well connected to the rest of the city through extensive road and rail connections, plus an international gateway to the world via the Maritime ports.

The Urban Redevelopment Authority envisaged the introduction of more homes of various types to the area, particularly in the Downtown Core which has been overwhelmingly commercial for the past decades. Supporting institutions and transport networks were upgraded or introduced to cater to the rising resident population in the area.

In terms of business, the New Downtown@Marina Bay was developed into an extension of the existing central business district. To encourage greater land-use flexibility, new business zones and white zones were also introduced. Business and research activities were promoted at the new one-north and medical park within the grounds of the Singapore General Hospital at Outram Park.

For recreation, plans were made to further extend the park connectors to new and existing parks in the region. New sporting facilities were also introduced, such as the redevelopment of the Kallang Sports Hub. Building conservation will continue to be enforced, and nodes for nidge activities will be provided for the masses. Plans for spaces catering specifically for youth activities near Orchard Road are a case in point.

Geography

It is the only region to border all the other regions and the Straits of Singapore to the south. The region is also home to the 3.2 kilometers long Singapore River, from its source at Kim Seng Bridge to where it empties into Marina Bay. The region also features Singapore's natural tallest point - Bukit Timah Hill with a height of 163.63 metres (537 ft.) above ground level.

Planning Areas
 Bishan
 Bukit Merah
 Bukit Timah
 11 planning areas of the Central Area
 Geylang
 Kallang
 Marine Parade
 Novena
 Queenstown
 Southern Islands
 Tanglin
 Toa Payoh

References

External links
 Central Region, Singapore

 
Planning areas in Singapore
Regions of Singapore